FK Fərid Baku was an Azerbaijani football club from Baku founded in 1995, and dissolved in 1997.

They came third in the Azerbaijan First Division during their first season as a club, gaining promotion to the Azerbaijan Top Division. In their one and only season in the First Division they finished 7th in the league and reached the semi-finals of the Azerbaijan Cup, getting beaten by Khazri Buzovna.

League and domestic cup history

References 

Football clubs in Azerbaijan
Association football clubs established in 1995
Defunct football clubs in Azerbaijan
Association football clubs disestablished in 1997